No Memory is the debut studio album by American indie rock band No. 2, released in 1999 by record label Chainsaw.

Content 

Elliott Smith, No. 2 frontman Neil Gust's former Heatmiser bandmate, performs backing vocals on "Critical Mass" as well as mixing on most of the album.

Release 

No Memory was released in 1999 by record label Chainsaw. The album was remastered and reissued on 180-gram vinyl on Record Store Day 2015 by Jackpot Records. The reissue, limited to 1500 copies, features previously-unheard bonus tracks.

Reception 

Ron Hart of CMJ New Music Report called it "a more realised version of the Apple/Dischord Records hybrid once orchestrated by, well, Heatmiser. But the No. 2's debut achieves its own gorgeous, pitch-perfect balance between acoustic Simon and Garfunkel-ish harmonies and a post-British Invasion power pop punch, as it sways with all the candor of Gust's old band. [...] The half-hour No Memory may be short on time, but it's endless on soul."

Track listing 

 "Critical Mass" – 3:07
 "Never Felt Better" – 2:48
 "Move It Along" – 3:33
 "So Long" – 2:48
 "Just Answer the Man" – 4:18
 "Pop in C" – 2:48
 "Practicing Your Moves" – 3:01
 "Pop in A Minor" – 2:25
 "Nobody's Satisfied" – 2:29
 "Parting Kiss" – 2:57

Bonus tracks on 2015 reissue 
 Allistair Chestnut (Harmony Mix)
 Powder Blue
 Run Through
 Little Face
 Critical Mass (Demo)
 Never Felt Better (Demo)
 Practicing Your Moves (Demo)
 Parting Kiss (Demo)

Personnel 

 Neil Gust – vocals, guitar, keyboards
 Gilly Ann Hanner – backing vocals, bass guitar
 Paul Pulvirenti – drums, percussion

 Additional personnel

 Joanna Bolme – hand claps on "Critical Mass", engineering
 Sam Coomes – bass guitar on "Never Felt Better" and "Nobody's Satisfied", backing vocals on "So Long"
 Stef Darensbourg – hand claps on "Critical Mass"
 Tony Lash – electric piano (on "Never Felt Better"), engineering
 Elliott Smith – backing vocals on "Critical Mass", "So Long" and last four bonus tracks, mixing

 Technical

 Larry Crane – engineering, mixing

References

External links 

 Pitchfork article on the album
 Spin article on the album
 OregonLive.com article on the album

1999 albums